Sutilizona pterodon is a species of sea snail, a marine gastropod mollusk in the family Sutilizonidae.

Description
The shell grows to a size of 2 mm.

Distribution
This marine species occurs off the Mid-Atlantic Ridge.

References

 Warén, A. & Bouchet, P. (2001) Gastropoda and Monoplacophora from hydrothermal vents and seeps; new taxa and records. The Veliger, 44, 116–231
 Geiger D.L. (2012) Monograph of the little slit shells. Volume 1. Introduction, Scissurellidae. pp. 1–728. Volume 2. Anatomidae, Larocheidae, Depressizonidae, Sutilizonidae, Temnocinclidae. pp. 729–1291. Santa Barbara Museum of Natural History Monographs Number 7.

Sutilizonidae
Gastropods described in 2001